The 2019 Ottawa Redblacks season was the sixth season for the team in the Canadian Football League. This was the sixth season with Marcel Desjardins as general manager and Rick Campbell as head coach.

The Redblacks were eliminated from playoff contention for the first time since their inaugural season in 2014 following a week 18 loss to the Toronto Argonauts on October 11, 2019.

Offseason

Free-Agency 
The 2018 CFL free agency period officially opened at 12:00pm EST on February 12, 2019. Significant transactions are listed below:

Retained

Additions

Departed

Foreign drafts
For the first time in its history, the CFL held drafts for foreign players from Mexico and Europe. Like all other CFL teams, the Redblacks held three non-tradeable selections in the 2019 CFL–LFA Draft, which took place on January 14, 2019. The 2019 European CFL Draft took place on April 11, 2019 where all teams held one non-tradeable pick.

CFL draft
The 2019 CFL Draft took place on May 2, 2019. By virtue of being the 106th Grey Cup runner-up, the Redblacks had the second-last selection in each round, not including traded picks. The team traded their second-round pick to the Montreal Alouettes in exchange for Chris Ackie.

Preseason

Schedule 

 Games played with colour uniforms.

Regular season

Standings

Schedule 

 Games played with white uniforms.
 Games played with colour uniforms.

Team

Roster

Coaching staff

References

External links
 

2019 Canadian Football League season by team
2019 in Ontario
Ottawa Redblacks seasons